The Technological University of El Salvador or Universidad Tecnológica de El Salvador, is a higher education center in El Salvador, known as UTEC or "la Tecno", owned by a private capital company. The university campus is located in San Salvador and has ten classroom buildings, an auditorium, a library, specialized laboratories, a cultural center, and computer centers, in addition to Radio UTEC (970 AM) and Tecnovisión (Channel 33).

History 
It was founded on June 12, 1981, by an agreement of the Ministry of Education, at the request of a group of citizens at the time when the University of El Salvador had been closed and occupied militarily. It was located in Chahín building, Rubén Darío street, San Salvador.

The construction of Simón Bolívar in 1986, and Francisco Morazán in 1987.

Faculties 
The university offers a wide range of careers from different faculties, in addition to having masters and postgraduate degrees.

Faculty of Business 

 Bachelor of Business Administration
 Bachelor of Business Administration with Emphasis in Computing
 Bachelor of Tourism Business Administration
 Bachelor of Public Accounting
 Bachelor of Marketing
 Bachelor of International Business
 Bachelor of Business Administration with Emphasis in English
 Bachelor of Marketing with Emphasis in English
 Bachelor of Tourism Business Administration with Emphasis in English
 Tourist Administration Technician
 Marketing and Sales Technician

Faculty of Social Sciences 

 Bachelor of English language
 Bachelor of Psychology
 Bachelor of Communications
 Bachelor of Communications with an emphasis in English
 Public Relations Technician

Law School 

 Bachelor of Legal Sciences
 Faculty of Informatics and Applied Sciences
 Systems and Computer Engineering
 Industrial engineering
 Industrial Engineering with Emphasis on English
 Architecture
 Degree in computer science
 Bachelor of Graphic Design
 Technician in graphic design
 Computer Network Engineering Technician
 Software Engineering Technician

Faculty of Masters 

 Master in Financial Administration
 Master in Business Administration
 Master in Banking and Finance
 Master in Business Administration No Face
 Master in Financial Management No Face-to-Face
 Master in Human Talent Management
 Master in Criminology
 Master in Forensic Auditing
 Master in Tax Audit

References 

Universities in El Salvador
Educational institutions established in 1982
1982 establishments in El Salvador
San Salvador